Simon Daniel Clifford Townsley (born 1963) is a photojournalist with The Telegraph documenting issues of Global Health Security Simon has received British Press Photographer of the Year award on two occasions (1991, 1995) and has covered some of history's most notable events, including protests in Tiananmen Square, the Gulf War, fall of the Berlin Wall, siege of Sarajevo and the election of Nelson Mandela.

Early life and work 
Born in New Zealand, Simon became interested in photography in his early 20's. His was inspired by the work of Larry Burrows through is book Vietnam. Even now, this book holds a prominent space on Simon's private bookshelf.

During his 14 years as Senior Photographer at the Sunday Times (London), Simon covered conflicts around the world, including the Balkans, West Africa, the Middle East and Asia.

A 2002 project called OILMAN was an exploration of photography in a pure sense. Documenting industrial landscapes in over 20 countries, Simon examined the relationship between humans and the natural world. This series explores the drama of pursuing oil across the globe. These images were captured in large-format and showcased as grand-scale prints around the globe.

Currently, Simon works with the Telegraph Media Group Global Health Security Team which brings highlights health issues using long-form journalism and in-depth reporting.